Henry Christian Kumpf (July 12, 1830 - April 13, 1904) was elected to three one-year terms as Mayor of Kansas City, Missouri in 1886-1889. During his term the "City of Kansas" formally changed its name to "Kansas City."

Biography
He was born in Beerfelden, Hesse, Germany.

He moved to St. Louis, Missouri in 1850 where he studied English as a grocery clerk and worked as a shipping clerk at the St. Louis Arsenal from 1861 to 1865.  After the American Civil War, he moved to Kansas City where he opened a billiard hall.  He was city auditor from 1872 to 1876, and city comptroller from 1877 to 1879.

His residences included 2nd and High Streets, 1222 Delaware (Baltimore), and he died while living with his son George, at 1109 Forest.

He is buried in Elmwood Cemetery.  His father was a pallbearer at his funeral. 
A public elementary school at 44th and Wabash, near Brooklyn Park, was named after him.  It has since been torn down.

References

1830 births
1904 deaths
People from Beerfelden
Mayors of Kansas City, Missouri
German emigrants to the United States
People from the Grand Duchy of Hesse